Endapalli is a village in Chintalapudi mandal, Eluru district ChintalapudiConstituency, India.

References 

Villages in Krishna district